State Highway 2 (SH 2) is a state highway in West Bengal, India.

Route

SH 2 originates from its junction with NH 14 at Bankura and passes through Indpur, Hatimrampur, Khatra, Simlapal, Taldangra, Bishnupur, Jaypur, Kotulpur, Arambag, Champadanga, Tarakeswar, Singur, Baidyabati, Dankuni, Uttarpara, Baranagar, Dakshineswar, Barrackpore, Barasat, Berachampa, Kholapota, Basirhat, Taki and terminates at its junction with SH 3 at Malancha in North 24 Parganas district.

National Highway Authority of India or NHAI has proposed to include section of SH 2 from Simlapal via  Taldangra, Bishnupur, Jaypur, Kotulpur, Arambag to Champadanga under a new National Highway for 2022/23, but details not decided yet. The new highway will connect Jhargram with Dankuni via Jhilimili, Mukutmanipur, Simlapal, Taldangra, Bishnupur, Jaypur, Kotulpur, Arambag, Champadanga & Chanditala.

The total length of SH 2 is 323 km.

Districts traversed by SH 2 are:
Bankura district (0 - 117 km)Hooghly district (117 - 196 km)North 24 Parganas (196 - 323 km)

Road sections
It is divided into different sections as follows:

See also
List of state highways in West Bengal

External links

References

State Highways in West Bengal